The New Haven Knights were a minor professional ice hockey team and members of the United Hockey League from 2000 to 2002. They played in New Haven, Connecticut, at the New Haven Coliseum, and were the last team to play at that venue, folding when the Coliseum closed in 2002.

See also
Professional ice hockey in Connecticut

Ice hockey clubs established in 2000
Sports clubs disestablished in 2002
Ice hockey teams in Connecticut
2000 establishments in Connecticut
2002 disestablishments in Connecticut